Brass Against is a musical collective that creates brass-inflected cover versions of rock songs. The collective chooses politically charged songs and other socially conscious music in order to raise awareness of various issues and to encourage activism and social change.

Brass Against was founded by guitarist Brad Hammonds. Hammonds was galvanized by the rise of Donald Trump. Hammonds later said he felt "we needed Rage Against the Machine more than ever" in the run-up to the 2016 United States presidential election "and wanted to do something besides simply expressing views on social media." Hammonds and saxophonist Andy Gutauskas gathered some friends who recorded their first video, a cover of "Bombtrack" released in September 2017.

In 2021, lead singer Sophia Urista urinated on a fan onstage during a Welcome to Rockville performance at Daytona International Speedway in Daytona Beach, Florida. Brass Against apologized, tweeting that Urista had gotten "carried away". He added: "That's not something the rest of us expected, and it's not something you'll see again at our shows." The band was banned from performing at the festival and future NASCAR events.

A cover of RATM's Wake Up was featured in the end credits of the 2021 film The Matrix Resurrections.

References

External links
 
 
 

Rage Against the Machine
Political music groups
Musical groups established in the 2010s
Cover bands
Musical collectives